Neolamprologus longior is a species of cichlid endemic to Lake Tanganyika and found at Kabogo Point and Kibwe Bay.  This species can reach a length of  TL.  It can also be found in the aquarium trade.

References

Maréchal, C. and M. Poll, 1991. Neolamprologus. p. 274-294. In J. Daget, J.-P. Gosse, G.G. Teugels and D.F.E. Thys van den Audenaerde (eds.) Check-list of the freshwater fishes of Africa (CLOFFA). ISNB, Brussels; MRAC, Tervuren; and ORSTOM, Paris. Vol. 4. 

longior
Fish of the Democratic Republic of the Congo
Taxa named by Wolfgang Staeck
Fish described in 1980
Taxonomy articles created by Polbot